The 1952 United States presidential election in Connecticut  took place on November 4, 1952, as part of the 1952 United States presidential election which was held throughout all contemporary 48 states. Voters chose eight representatives, or electors to the Electoral College, who voted for president and vice president.

Connecticut voted for the Republican nominee, General Dwight D. Eisenhower of New York, over the Democratic nominee, former Governor Adlai Stevenson of Illinois. Eisenhower ran with Senator Richard Nixon of California, while Stevenson's running mate was Senator John Sparkman of Alabama.

Eisenhower won Connecticut by a margin of 11.79%.

Results

By county

See also
 United States presidential elections in Connecticut

References

Connecticut
1952
1952 Connecticut elections